The 2016 Liga Dominicana de Fútbol season (known as the LDF Banco Popular for sponsorship reasons) is the 2nd season of professional football in the Dominican Republic. Club Atlético Pantoja are the reigning champions, having won their first title last year.

Stadia and locations
Each team will play 18 matches in the regular season, the 4 teams with most points qualify to the playoffs. The champion will be decided in a single-legged final.

League table

Championship round

Semifinals

First leg

Second leg

Cibao FC wins 2–1 on aggregate

Club Barcelona Atlético wins 4–1 on aggregate

Final

Results

Top goalscorers

Hat-tricks

Awards

Player of the week

References

External links
FIFA
Liga Dominicana de Fútbol

Football in the Dominican Republic
Dominican Republic
Dominican Republic
2016 in Dominican Republic sport
Liga Dominicana de Fútbol seasons